Raman Thediya Seethai is a 2008 Indian Tamil-language drama film written and directed by K. P. Jagan. The film features an ensemble cast including Cheran, Pasupathy, Nithin Sathya, Vimala Raman, Remya Nambeeshan, Gajala, Navya Nair, and Karthika. The music was composed by Vidyasagar with cinematography by Rajesh Yadav and editing by Kola Bhaskar. The film released on 19 September 2008 to positive response and turned out as a success.

In 2012, the film was remade in Kannada as Gowri Puthra with Akshay.

Plot

The movie starts with Venugopal meeting Ranjitha, whose parents want them to get married. During their conversation, Venu informs Ranjitha that he stammers if he gets stressed and is also undergoing treatment for psychological problems while he was at school. Ranjitha gets scared hearing this and turns down the proposal.

Venu is a kindhearted person who manages his own wedding card business. He remains clear that the girl that he marries should know about his problem, and he does not want to marry someone by hiding his problem. Venu's mother arranges to meet another girl named Vidhya. Vidhya agrees for the wedding despite knowing Venu's problems. However, on the day before the wedding, Vidhya's lover Ramesh, with whom she has broken up, comes and apologizes. Vidhya changes her mind and elopes with Ramesh, which shocks both Venu and her father Manikkavel.

However, Venu cancels the wedding saying that he is not interested in marrying Vidhya, thereby hiding the truth that Vidhya has eloped with someone. Manikkavel feels proud seeing Venu and also feels bad that his daughter has missed such a kindhearted person in her life. Also, Manickavel apologizes to Venu for his daughter's behaviour and promises to find a suitable girl for Venu soon.

After so many girls rejecting Venu due to his stammering speech problem, Gayathri agrees to marry him. Venu also likes Gayathri, but he meets Gunasekhar, an auto driver who claims to be Gayathri's lover. Guna describes his one side love towards Gayathri to Venu and Manickavel while travelling in his auto without knowing that Venu has come to see Gayathri. Venu meets Gayathri and tells her that Guna loves her sincerely and advises her to accept his love. Gayathri also understands this and agrees to marry Guna.

On the other hand, there is a positive love story told between a visually challenged RJ named Nedumaran and Thamizhisai. Nedumaran anchors a radio program about the importance of facing life with a positive attitude, and Thamizhisai is a fan of Nedumaran's radio program. However, Thamizhisai is surprised to learn that Nedumaran is visually challenged. Despite this, she feels proud of him seeing his positive attitude towards life. They become good friends, and Thamizhisai proposes to Nedumaran, which he does not accept as he fears that her family members will not allow her to marry him. He later realizes her true love, and they both get married. Venu is a friend of Nedumaran and he is inspired by his positive tone in life.

Venu and Manikkavel travel to Nagercoil for a business visit. Venu is shocked by Vidhya's poverty. Venu leaves without informing Manikkavel to meet Vidhya and discovers that she is pregnant and Ramesh is in jail for involving in a clash with their neighbour. Vidhya works in a small school and struggles to lead a proper life without money. Venu feels bad seeing her condition and gives some money. He also takes her to a nearby private hospital for a check-up. To his surprise, Ranjitha works as a receptionist in that hospital. Venu introduces Vidhya as his friend and requests Ranjitha to assist her during her further check-ups, and he pays the hospital expenses.

As Vidhya's delivery date approaches, Venu decides to stay in Nagercoil for a few more days until she gives birth to the child, thereby assisting with the hospital formalities. Slowly, Venu befriends Ranjitha, and the two meet frequently. Vidhya gives birth to a baby, and Venu informs this to Manikkavel, who gets furious hearing this. Manikkavel gets emotional and scolds Venu for helping someone who ditched him on the day of wedding. However, Venu convinces Manikkavel and takes him to see his daughter. Ranjitha learns about Venu's great character and slowly, she falls in love.

Now, Venu and Manikkavel are set to meet a girl named Senthamarai who is a sub-inspector in Nagercoil. Venu informs this to Ranjitha, which shocks her. Ranjitha does not express her love towards Venu. Venu decides to secretly meet Senthamarai while she is on duty without informing her. Suddenly, violence erupts in the location, and Senthamarai starts hitting the protesters in order to control the crowd. She even hits Venu also without knowing that he has come to visit her. Venu feels guilty now and decides to cancel the meeting. While returning, he sees Ranjitha's house on the way. He decides to refresh there and then leave. However, Ranjitha proposes her love to Venu and apologizes for rejecting him at the beginning, not understanding his true character, which is more precious. Venu understands Ranjitha and decides to marry her.

Cast

Production

Casting
The film was announced in 2007, and the photo session was held at the time of launch. Gajala was selected as one of the leads. Kerala-based Remya Nambeesan was selected, and she joined in second schedule. Vimala Raman of Poi, Karthika of Thoothukudi, and Navya Nair were selected since the story needed five heroines. Pasupathy and Nithin Sathya were selected to play important roles.

Filming
Director Jagan said that "There are 78 scenes whereas there are 94 locations in the film" and added that "in most of the scenes there would be a small flashback and if this is taken into consideration then there are more locations in the film rather than scenes".

Controversy
The unit was highly criticized, when it had used the vehicle registration number of a revenue department officer without obtaining proper permissions. A complaint was filed with the police against director Cheran; however, no official complaint was later lodged.

In January 2008, the shooting of the film was in progress at Boothapandi in Kanyakumari district. During the shooting, 12 vehicles were involved, which were going to parade for a minister in the scene. Hundreds of people were gathered to watch this shoot in the village. The last vehicle, which was the jeep, hit an old woman Kuttralammal and she was thrown afar. She was admitted in a hospital, where she died the next day.

The local inspector registered a case against the driver of the jeep and the director. Shooting was cancelled.

Soundtrack

The soundtrack is composed by Vidyasagar, and it was well received. Balu Mahendra and Bhagyaraj released the audio, which was held in Sathyam Cinemas on 30 July 2008. During the audio release, Cheran made controversial statements about reporters by publishing rumours about him.

Critical reception
Rediff wrote:"There's a delicate balance between portraying a genuinely touching story and going overboard with emotions. And that's where Global One Studio Productions' Raman Thediya Seethai (Rama's Hunt for Seetha), directed by K P Jagannath, manages to be different". Behindwoods wrote:"The director needs to be appreciated for delivering a film without kissing or glamorous scenes. However, he could have tried to make the subject a bit more interesting". Sify wrote:"RTS is riveting cinema and exhibits emotional depth and is a clean feel-good family entertainer". Nowrunning wrote:"Minus violence and item numbers, 'Raman Thediya Seethai,' a feel good romance certainly entertains".

References

Indian drama films
2008 drama films
2008 films
2000s Tamil-language films
Films scored by Vidyasagar
Tamil films remade in other languages